Den vilda is a studio album released by the Swedish pop group One More Time in 1996. The album peaked at number 29 on the Swedish Albums Chart. One year later it was released again with the songs translated into English. The title of the new album was Living in a Dream and the cover art was different. The English version also included a new English version of the song Det vackraste, written by the band members and performed by Cecilia Vennersten at Melodifestivalen 1995.

Track listing 
 Den vilda
 Kvarnen
 Skuggan bakom dig
 De oskattbara
 Labyrinten
 Vintergatan
 Råttfångarn
 Hela täcket för mig själv
 Huset
 Vägskälet
 Den vilda - forsen om våren

English version

Track listing 
The titles of the Swedish versions within brackets.
Living in a Dream (Det vackraste)
The Wilderness Mistress (Den vilda)
Putting on the Charm (Kvarnen)
You Will Never Be Alone (Skuggan bakom dig)
Invaluable (De oskattbara)
The Maze (Labyrinten)
Milky Way (Vintergatan)
The Whole Quilt All to Myself (Hela täcket för mig själv)
The Pied Piper (Råttfångar'n)
Crossroads (Vägskälet)
The Wilderness Mistress - Rapids in Springtime (Den vilda - forsen om våren)

References

One More Time (band) albums
1996 albums
1997 albums